Queens-Shelburne is a provincial electoral district in  Nova Scotia, Canada, that elects one member of the Nova Scotia House of Assembly. The riding was created in 2012 with 89 per cent of the former district of Queens, 46 per cent of the former district of Shelburne and 1 per cent of the former district of Digby-Annapolis. It consists of the towns of Lockeport and Shelburne, the Municipality of the District of Shelburne, and the Region of Queens Municipality.

Members of the Legislative Assembly
This riding has elected the following Members of the Legislative Assembly:

Election results

2017 general election

2013 general election

|-

|New Democratic Party
|Sterling Belliveau
|align="right"| 3,066
|align="right"| 37.10
|align="right"| N/A
|-

|Progressive Conservative
|Bruce Inglis
|align="right"| 2,685
|align="right"| 32.49
|align="right"| N/A
|-

|Liberal
|Benson Frail
|align="right"| 2,302
|align="right"| 27.86
|align="right"| N/A
|-

|Green
|Madeline Taylor
|align="right"| 211
|align="right"| 2.55
|align="right"| N/A
|-

|-
|}

References

External links
 2013 riding profile

Nova Scotia provincial electoral districts